Barnsley Football Club is an English association football club based in the South Yorkshire town of Barnsley. Founded in 1887 under the name Barnsley St Peter's, the team played in the Sheffield & District League from the 1890–91 season and first entered the FA Cup in 1893–94. Two years later, they were accepted into the Midland League. The club changed its name to Barnsley F.C. in 1897; its team finished as Midland League runners-up in the first season under the new name, and were elected to the newly expanded Second Division of the Football League for the 1898–99 season. A 16th-place finish in their second season meant they had to apply for re-election; the application was successful, and Barnsley continued safely in mid-table until 1911, when they again needed to be re-elected to the League. Their cup form was rather better: either side of that poor League placing, they reached the FA Cup final. In 1909–10, they drew 1–1 with Newcastle United in the final at Crystal Palace, but lost 1–0 in the replay at Everton's Goodison Park ground. Two seasons later, after taking three replays to get through the quarter-final, they played out a goalless draw with West Bromwich Albion at Crystal Palace; this time Barnsley won the replay, at Sheffield United's Bramall Lane ground, by one goal to nil.

In the remaining years before competitive football was suspended for the duration of the First World War, Barnsley established themselves as one of the stronger sides in the Second Division, placing third in 1914–15. The First Division was to be expanded by two teams for the first post-war season. Traditionally, existing top-flight teams were reprieved from relegation when such an expansion took place, but when the League chose to relegate Tottenham Hotspur, who had finished bottom, Barnsley had expectations of promotion. Instead of promoting the top three from the Second Division, the top two went up and the League opted to ballot its members as to the third candidate; Arsenal, who had finished fifth in 1915, won the ballot. Barnsley missed out on promotion in 1921–22 on goal average, and continued in the Second Division until 1931–32 when they went down to the Third Division North, also on goal average. They returned to the second tier as champions two years later, were relegated in 1938, and won another Third Division title in 1939.

After relegation in 1953, Barnsley won the Third Division championship for a third time in 1955, but ten years later they were in the Fourth Division. They moved between fourth and third tiers before two promotions in three years took them back to the Second Division in 1981, in which they remained for the next sixteen seasons. With two matches left to play in the 1996–97 season, to the accompaniment of chants of "It's just like watching Brazil", Danny Wilson had managed Barnsley to within one win of promotion to the Premier League. At home to Bradford City, Paul Wilkinson gave them a first-half lead, and with three minutes to go, Clint Marcelle scored the goal that made sure of the win. Barnsley's visit to the top flight was brief; they finished 19th, five points short of safety. They came close to a return in 2000 via the play-offs, losing 4–2 in the final after Ipswich Town's goalkeeper had saved a penalty and made a late save to deny them an equaliser.

Two years later, they were relegated to the third tier, which combined with the loss of revenue following the failure of ITV Digital and its broadcasting deal with the Football League made Barnsley one of some thirty clubs driven into administration. They recovered, and went on to beat Swansea City in a penalty shoot-out in the 2006 play-off final and return to the second tier, by then renamed the Championship. Despite finishing no higher than 17th place, they retained their second-tier status for eight seasons. Relegated in 2014, they returned via the play-offs, beating Millwall 3–1 in the 2016 final. Also in 2015–16, Barnsley beat Oxford United 3–2 in the final to win the Football League Trophy, a cup competition open to teams from the lower two divisions of the Football League, for the first time. They were again relegated in 2017–18, but made an immediate return to the Championship, and in 2020–21, reached the play-offs, in which they lost to Swansea City in the semi-final. In in finishing bottom of the 2021–22 Championship, they recorded the second lowest number of wins and points (adjusted for three points for a win) in the club's history, won the fewest away matches since 1930, scored the fewest goals for 50 years and set a club record for fewest scored at home.

As of the end of the 2021–22 season, Barnsley have spent 10 seasons in the fourth tier of the English football league system, 24 in the third, 78 in the second and 1 in the top tier. The table details the team's achievements and the top goalscorer in senior first-team competitions from their first season in the Sheffield & District League in 1890–91 to the end of the most recently completed season.

Key

Key to league record:
P – Played
W – Games won
D – Games drawn
L – Games lost
F – Goals for
A – Goals against
Pts – Points
Pos – Final position

Key to divisions:
Sheff – Sheffield & District League
Sheff 2 – Sheffield & District League Second Division
Sheff C – Sheffield & District League Central Division
Midland – Midland League
Yorks – Yorkshire League
Div 1 – Football League First Division
Div 2 – Football League Second Division
Div 3 – Football League Third Division
Div 3N – Football League Third Division North
Div 4 – Football League Fourth Division
Prem – Premier League
Champ – Football League Championship
League 1 – Football League One

Key to rounds:
Prelim – Preliminary round
QR1 – First qualifying round
QR2 – Second qualifying round, etc.
Inter – Intermediate round (between qualifying rounds and rounds proper)
R1 – First round
R2 – Second round, etc.
QF – Quarter-final
SF – Semi-final
F – Final
W – Winners
(N) – Northern section of regionalised stage
DNE – Did not enter

Details of the abandoned 1939–40 Football League season are shown in italics and appropriately footnoted.

Seasons

Notes

References

External links
Barnsley F.C. official website

Seasons
 
Barnsley F.C.